Acacia infecunda, also known as famine wattle, is a shrub belonging to the genus Acacia and the subgenus Phyllodineae that is native to parts of south eastern Australia.

Description
It readily suckers and has glabrous branchlets. The thin and glabrous phyllodes are straight and flat and have a non-prominent midrib and absent lateral nerves.

Taxonomy
The species was first formally described by the botanists Bill Molyneux & S. G. Forrester in 2008 as part of the work "Three new Acacia species (Fabaceae: Mimosoideae) from East Gippsland, Victoria" as published in the journal Muelleria. It is closely related to Acacia boormanii which is much taller.

Distribution
The shrub has a limited distribution in north-western Victoria to the south of Wulgulmerang around Splitters Creek on elevated rocky areas in dry open forest communities growing in rocky shallow soils. Only a single small population of fragmented stands growing in a limited area is known on the Wombargo Range in the headwaters of the Little River which is a tributary of the Snowy River.

See also
List of Acacia species

References

infecunda
Flora of Victoria (Australia)
Plants described in 2008